Three Chimneys Archaeological Site is located at 715 West Granada Boulevard in Ormond Beach, Florida. It was listed on the National Register of Historic Places on September 16, 2010. The three chimneys were of a sugar-processing plant.

The site has been excavated.

See also
National Register of Historic Places listings in Volusia County, Florida

References

Archaeological sites in Florida